Soara-Joye Ross, previously known as Joy Ross, Joye Ross, Joy E. T. Ross, and also known as Soara-Joyce Ross (because of her name being misspelled) is an American actress and singer.

Career
Ross' Broadway acting credits include Les Misérables the Revival and Dance of the Vampires, where she made her Broadway debut.

Ross starred in the Off-Broadway productions of Single Black Female at the Playwrights Horizons theater and then The Duke on 42nd Street theater.  She performed in Dessa Rose at the Lincoln Center, where she was the second cover for La Chanze when she wasn't playing the role of Annabel. Ross also did Jerry Springer: The Opera at Carnegie Hall, and was in "The Tin Pan Alley Rag" at the Laura Pels Theatre with The Roundabout Theatre Company as a cover for the roles of Treemonisha and Monisha, where she performed the role Monisha.

Ross has performed overseas as a soloist in the popular European show Palazzo Colombino, done a tour of Ain't Misbehavin' playing the role of "Charlayne" and Smokey Joe's Café, where she was a swing for the roles "B.J.", "Patti" and "Brenda", and a U.S. tour of Smokey Joe's Cafe with Gladys Knight. Ms. Ross played the role of "Mama Lila" in the 2009 New York Musical Theatre Festival where she worked with Donna McKechnie and won the "Best of Fest" Outstanding Individual Performance Award in the show written by Allan Harris entitled Cross That River.

Regionally she has been in Aida (Aida) at The Arvada Center for the Arts and Humanities, where she was nominated By the Colorado Guild: Outstanding Performance by and Actress in a musical, Tick Tick Boom (Susan) at the Alliance Theater, From the Mississippi Delta, Ragtime (Sarah) at Gateway Playhouse and Weston Playhouse Theatre Company, Ain't Misbehavin''' (Armelia) at The Huntington Theatre Company and Once On This Island (Asaka/Andrea) at Sacramento Music Circus and The Bay Street Theatre/Mill Mountain Theater.

Ross has done numerous readings and workshops and also appeared in the feature film Garden State as the Handi-World Cashier.

In 2006, Ross started a support group called "OFF-STAGE" for actors, singers and other performances to help them deal with the entertainment business.

In 2018, Soara-Joye Ross was featured in the cast of CARMEN JONES at the Classic Stage in New York. The New York Times reviewer, Ben Brantley, praised her performance as Frankie, who sings, “Beat Out Dat Rhythm.” Brantley wrote: "The soloist here is the marvelous Soara-Joye Ross as Frankie, and for the duration of the song, she is the life force incarnate, exultant and undeniable. There may be tragedy just around the corner, but for the immediate now, human existence seems like a blessed gift. Frankie concludes the song proclaiming there “ain’t but one big heart for the whole world,” and for those few radiant minutes, you actually believe her.

Personal background
Ross was born in Queens, New York. She was adopted by Rita T. Ross (now Rita Soares) and Joseph Ross at a very young age. In 2005 Ross reunited with her birth mother Lavonne Patterson. Upon finding her mother, she reunited with her paternal grandmother, maternal grandfather and years later her birth father Orick Sweetwine.

Ross attended Nassau Community College majoring in Vocal Performance.  However, after doing musical theater work at Nassau, Ross  transferred for her second year of college to The American Musical and Dramatic Academy with a scholarship. After completing the Academy program, Ross began working professionally in theater. However, since Ross wasn't getting the roles she wanted, she attended J. Beckson Studio in New York to continue learning the Meisner Technique for acting. At this point, her acting career began to flourish.

In September 2007, Ross was in rehearsals for a show in New York and after weeks of not feeling well was hospitalized the day before opening night where she was diagnosed as a Type 1 Diabetic. In 2010 she became a member of the not-for-profit organization ACT1 Diabetes. Since then she's been extremely active in the organization as Co-Facilitator for the Young Women with Diabetes Support Group and Donations Coordinator for the Supply Exchange Program.

Ross now resides in Brooklyn, New York with her Pomeranian, Lyric. She is working with other artists on a new musical written by Jay Kuo. Ross is also working on a solo piece about her own life.

Ross is a member of the Actors' Equity Association and the Screen Actor's Guild.

 Broadway Les Misérables (Revival)		Chorus Specialty Roles	Directed by	John CairdDance of the Vampires Featured Ensemble Directed by John Rando

 Off-Broadway Trav'lin*  NYMF    Ros     Directed by Paul StancatoCross That River* NYMF    Mama Lila     Directed by           Andrew Wilk, TBG TheaterThe Tin Pan Alley Rag         u/s Tremonisha/Monisha      	  The Laura Pels Theatre w/ The Roundabout Theater Co.  Directed by                  Stafford Arima Single Black Female         SBF #2 -Lead			The Duke/Playwrights Horizons Directed by Colman Domingo Dessa Rose         Annabel/Dessa Rose u/s	    Directed by             Graciela Daniele    Original Cast Recording				  	(performed)		        Lincoln CenterLangston In Harlem * Namt Festival         Ex-Harlemite	                                                               Dodgers Stages

 National and European tours Smokey Joe’s Café with Gladys Knight       BJ/Patti/Brenda (Swing)Directed by		Joey McNeallyAin’t Misbehavin’		        Joy (Charlayne)	Directed by	 	Jim Weaver

 Workshops and concerts Jerry Springer the Opera at Carnegie Hall	        Audience/Ensemble		Jason Moore, Stephen OremusDessa Rose (La Chanze & Donna Murphy)		        Annabel				Graciela DanieleBall (LL Cool J, Anika Noni Rose, Shoshana Bean)	        Muse/Skankette  	Charles Randolph WrightPalazzo Colombino                                       Diva          Basel Switzerland

 Film Garden State (Zach Braff & Natalie Portman)		Handi-World Cashier	        Zach Braff      Camelot Pictures

 Readings Invisible Life (Lillias White & Chuck Cooper)		Nicole Springer			Sugar Bar, Rajendra Ramoon MaharajBarnstormer (Natasha Williams & David St, Louis) 	Bessie Coleman			Hartford Stage, Jerry DixonOn, Girl (Jennifer Holliday & Sharon Wilkins)		Soara-Joye			Ars Nova, Lewis Flinn & Steven SaterDeadlines (Brandon Victor Dixon & Darius De Haas)        Franchesca			Charles Randolph WrightBare         Tonya				Westbank Café, Kristin HanggiA Good Man         Lettie				York TheaterLangston in Harlem (Adriane Lenox & Billy Porter)        Ex- Harlemite			Kent GashThe Funkentine Rapture                 Simone Funk			Lee SummersAdam         Allegra				Maurice Brandon CurryDo*rian Gray (Christiane Noll)			        Sybil Vane			Lynne-Taylor CorbettMy Name is Alice         Soara-Joye (Charlayne)		Adam MullerThe Gospel…Fishman (Michele Pawk)		        Jolene				Eric Shaeffer		Starmites (Alaina Reed-Hall)			        Banshee				Don't Tell MamaTaking Step 313         Tonia				Joe's Pub

 Regional From the Mississippi Delta         Woman 1				Triad Stage/Donna BradbyAida                                                 Aida				Arvada CenterTick, Tick…Boom!         Susan/Karessa			Alliance/Kent GashOnce on this Island         Asaka				Sacramento M C & Bay StreetAin’t Misbehavin’         Soara-Joye (Armelia)		Huntington TheatreRagtime                 Sarah				Gateway & WestonBeehive         Joye 				Cincinnati PlayhouseOnce on this Island         Andrea				Mill Mountain TheatreShe Loves Me         Amalia Balash			NCC/Robert EinenkelCeremonies in Dark Old Men''         Adele Parker			NCC/Bruce Jenkins

Training 
Meisner Technique & Sitcom Workshop: J. Beckson Studio
Film Audition Workshop: Heidi Marshall
The American Musical and Dramatic Academy
Nassau Community College: Classical Voice
Vocal Coach/Technicians: Scott Conner, Dr. Anat Keidar, Jack Waddell, Dorothy Stone

Awards 
2009 New York Music Theatre Festival's "Best of Fest" Outstanding Individual  Performance Award Winner(Cross That River)
2006 Henry Award Nominee for Outstanding Actress in a Musical (Aida)
Best Actress in a Musical (Aida) -Dreamwell.com

References

American musical theatre actresses
Living people
People from Queens, New York
Musicians from Brooklyn
Actresses from New York City
Year of birth missing (living people)
Nassau Community College alumni
21st-century American women